Ilona Mitrecey (born 1 September 1993 in Fontenay-aux-Roses, Hauts-de-Seine) (more commonly known as Ilona) is a retired French singer.

Biography

Ilona always dreamed of becoming a stuntwoman or filmmaker. Her parents knew an Italian music producer who was looking for a kid to record a song in French for the Italian market and asked Ilona. A few years after, the record label decided to release the song in France and that's when Ilona became famous.

She became famous in France after the release of her hit single, "Un Monde parfait" ("A Perfect World"), a high-energy eurodance song which had already been released in Italy in March 2004 under the name 'Très Bien featuring Ilona', on 28 February 2005. The song reached #1 on France's SNEP charts on 6 March 2005, and stayed on top of the charts for 15 weeks. Her second single, "C'est les vacances", was released on 20 June 2005.

Ilona finished highschool at Lycée Pasteur in Neuilly-sur-Seine in Hauts-de-Seine. She has sung in many advertisements. Her father was the singer in the band playing in some shows of Canal Plus and he composed the music of some films of Max Pécas, and her mother, Sylvie, works at the Michel Lafon publishing house. Her mother is now in a relationship with Rachid Arhab, a famous French journalist.

Her album was released on 10 October 2005.

Ilona very rarely does live performances, but she was coaxed into appearing on the nationally acclaimed show Hit Machine on M6 prior to the success of the single "Un Monde parfait".

In 2007, Ilona won an EBBA Award. Every year the EBBA recognizes the success of ten emerging artists or groups who reached audiences outside their own countries with their first internationally released album in the past year.

In 2007, she decided to stop her singing career to focus on her studies and enrolled in cinema studies between France and New York where she lived for one year. She has now finished her studies and is trying to find her dream job. She still records voices for commercials in France from time to time because she finds it fun but does it anonymously because she prefers to keep it quiet.

In 2018, Ilona returned to her singing career with a remix of "Noël que du bonheur", alongside an English cover of the song, with remixes of "Allo Allo" and "C'est les vacances" releasing the following year. Throughout the former half of 2020, several vlogs featuring her animated persona would be posted on her YouTube channel, alongside teasers for her next album, Magical World, which would release the same year.
.

Discography

Albums

Singles

Characters

Main 
 Ilona (voiced by Ilona Mitrecey)
 Ilona's Mom (voiced by Camille Dalmais)

DVD

See also
Pinocchio (singer)
Bébé Lilly
Titou Le Lapinou

References

External links 

 
 International Ilona Mitrecey Fan-Club (Russian)

1993 births
Living people
People from Fontenay-aux-Roses
French child singers
French-language singers
Mitrecey, Ilona
21st-century French singers
21st-century French women singers